Poppenhausen is a municipality in the district of Schweinfurt in Bavaria, Germany.

It consists of the following six localities: Hain, Kronungen, Kützberg, Maibach, Pfersdorf, Poppenhausen.

References

Schweinfurt (district)